Michaël Jérémiasz and Maikel Scheffers defeated Gustavo Fernández and Joachim Gérard in the final, 6–0, 4–6, 6–3 to win the men's doubles wheelchair tennis title at the 2013 US Open.

Stéphane Houdet and Nicolas Peifer were the reigning champions from when the event was last held in 2011, but Peifer did not participate. Houdet partnered Shingo Kunieda, but was defeated by Jérémiasz and Scheffers in the semifinals.

There was no edition of the event in 2012, due to a scheduling conflict with the 2012 Summer Paralympics.

Seeds
 Stéphane Houdet /  Shingo Kunieda (semifinals)
 Gordon Reid /  Ronald Vink (semifinals)

Doubles

Finals

References

External links
Main Draw

Wheelchair Men's Doubles
U.S. Open, 2013 Men's Doubles